This is a list of bi-level and multi-level bridges. All entries are bi-level unless otherwise stated.

Australia

 Grafton Bridge
 Pyrmont Bridge (pedestrian, and formerly monorail)

Austria
 Reichsbrücke, Vienna (road, subway, pedestrian)

Bangladesh

 The Padma Multipurpose Bridge  (railway and road)

Canada
 Dudley B. Menzies Bridge (pedestrian walkway and light railway)
 High Level Bridge (railway and road)
 Prince Edward Viaduct (road and rapid transit)
 Anthony Henday Drive bridge over North Saskatchewan River (southeast) (road and bicycle/pedestrian)
 Whirlpool Rapids Bridge (railway and road)
 Centre Street Bridge, Calgary (road and road)

China
 Qiantang River Bridge (road and railway)
 Nanjing Yangtze River Bridge (road and railway)
 Wuhan Yangtze River Bridge (road and railway)
 Chongqing Chaotianmen Bridge (road and rapid transit)
 Chongqing Dongshuimen Bridge (road and rapid transit)
 Chongqing Qianximen Bridge (road and rapid transit)
 Chongqing Caiyuanba Bridge (road and monorail)
 Oujiang Beikou Bridge (two roads)
 Shanghai Zhangpu Second Bridge (road and rapid transit)
 Wufengshan Yangtze River Bridge

Germany 
 Elstertalbrücke
 Göltzschtalbrücke
 Krämerbrücke
 Kanalbrücke Magdeburg
 Oberbaumbrücke

Hong Kong

 East Rail and a footbridge across Argyle Street
 Canal Road Flyover and the Canal Road bus lanes, and Wong Nai Chung Gap Flyover and Morrison Hill Road – (westernmost stretch of) Wong Nai Chung Road, over Bowrington Canal
  (road and footbridge)
 A bi-level footbridge between two blocks of the Children's Hospital
 Between Chow Yei Ching Building and the Jockey Club Tower in the University of Hong Kong (the former part of the Main Campus and the latter the Centennial Campus)
 The Atrium Link between phases one and two of the Convention and Exhibition Centre, and the Atrium Link Extension
 Conduit Road Flyover and footbridge
 Between the two towers of the Cullinan
 A footbridge between Domain and Lei Yue Mun Plaza shopping centre
 Two footbridges across  between One International Finance Centre and Two International Finance Centre
 Kap Shui Mun Bridge (road and rapid transit)
 Two footbridges across Kornhill Road between Kornhill Plaza North and Kornhill Plaza South
 Kwun Tong Road and Kwun Tong line across Tsui Ping Nullah (road and rapid transit)
 A footbridge between Lo Wu Control Point and Luohu Port (pedestrian; cross-border)
 A footbridge between Lok Ma Chau Spur Line Control Point and Futian Port (pedestrian; cross-border)
 Ma Wan Viaduct (road and rapid transit)
 Between blocks A and B of Mei Sun Lau at 442 Des Voeux Road West and 489–499 Queen's Road West
 Ngan Yat House in Ngan Wan Estate 
 A bridge across Pak Hok Ting Street, connecting New Town Plaza I and III
 PMQ — CUBE and PLATEAU between the Staunton and the Hollywood blocks
 Footbridges connecting two buildings of Christian Churches Union Pokfulam Road Cemetery 
 Prince Edward Road East across Kai Tak Nullah (flyover and ground-level road over a nullah)
 Rambler Channel Bridge (aka. Tsing Lai Bridge) (rapid transit, two tracks on each of the two levels)
 East Rail and a footbridge across Prince Edward Road West
 Three bridges across Sha Tin Centre Street that are part of New Town Plaza I
 Bridge between New Town Plaza I and Citylink Plaza and Sha Tin station across Tai Po Road — Sha Tin and East Rail
 Between the north and south blocks of SKH St Peter's Primary School
 Tai Po Road — Tai Wai and Tsing Sha Highway over East Rail (two levels of flyovers and a footbridge over railway tracks)
 Tsing Ma Bridge (road and rapid transit)
 Tsing Kwai Highway, Tung Chung line and Airport Express (road and four tracks of rapid transit) - two stretches
 Tsing Sha Highway
 One footbridge over Wang Tau Hom East Road, part of Lok Fu Place
 Two footbridges over Wang Tau Hom South Road, part of Lok Fu Place 
 Yasumoto Bridge and Fruit Bat Bridge

India
 Bogibeel Bridge (railway and road)
 Naranarayan Setu (railway and road)
 Rajendra Bridge (railway and road)
 Digha-Sonpur Bridge (railway and road)
 Munger Ganga Bridge (railway and road)
 Godavari Bridge (railway and road)

Japan 

 Ichikawa Station's forecourt
 A highway bridge in Kobe
 Sky Gate Bridge R at Kansai International Airport, carrying JR West, Nankai Railway and a six-lane expressway
 Nakanose Bashi, Sendai, Miyagi, over Hirose River

Luxembourg
 Adolphe Bridge (tram, road, pedestrian and bicycle traffic)

Macau 
 Ponte de Sai Van

Malaysia
 Kota Bridge, Klang, Selangor
 Double-decker sky bridge between the two towers of the Petronas Towers, Kuala Lumpur

Poland
 Gdański Bridge, Warsaw (road and tramway)

Portugal
 Dom Luís I Bridge (two levels, tramway and road)
 25 de Abril Bridge (road and railway)
 Ponte Eiffel (road and railway)
 Ponte de Valença (road and railway), in Valença, Portugal

Russia 
 ZSD in Saint Petersburg

Sweden 
 Sankt Eriksbron (road and metro)
 Øresund Bridge (road and railway; partially located within Danish waters, connecting with the Danish island of Peberholm)

Taiwan 
 Wuku–Yangmei Elevated Road in Taipei and Taoyuan counties
 Kin-Ma Bridge in Changhwa County
  in Taipei

United Kingdom 
 Craigavon Bridge (two levels of roadway)
 High Level Bridge, Newcastle upon Tyne, Gateshead (railway and roadway)
 Tinsley Viaduct, Sheffield) (M1 motorway and local road)
 Britannia Bridge Menai Strait (road and railway)

United States 
 San Francisco–Oakland Bay Bridge (two levels of roadways)
 Richmond–San Rafael Bridge (two levels of roadways)
 Interstate 229 (Missouri) (two levels of roadways)
 I Street Bridge (roadway and railroad)
 Washington Avenue Bridge (pedestrian and roadway)
 George Washington Bridge (two levels of roadways)
 Verrazzano-Narrows Bridge (two levels of roadways)
 Manhattan Bridge (two levels of roadways)
 Queensboro Bridge (two levels of roadways)
 Henry Hudson Bridge (two levels of roadways)
 Tobin Bridge (two levels of roadways)
 Girard Point Bridge (two levels of roadways)
 Fort Pitt Bridge (two levels of roadways)
 Fort Duquesne Bridge (two levels of roadways)
 Fort Madison Toll Bridge (swing bridge for roadway and railway)
 Sherman Minton Bridge (two levels of roadways)
 Steel Bridge (roadway and railway)
 Meridian Highway Bridge (two levels for pedestrians only)
 Marquam Bridge (two levels of roadways)
 Michigan Avenue Bridge (DuSable Bridge)
 Ship Canal Bridge (two levels of roadways)
 Fremont Bridge (Portland, Oregon) (two levels of roadways)
 Brent Spence Bridge (two levels of roadways)
 Williamsburg Bridge (pedestrian and roadway)
 Whirlpool Rapids Bridge (railway and roadway)
 Portage Canal Lift Bridge (abandoned railway and roadway)
 Kansas City Highline Bridge (two levels of railway)
 5-in-1 Bridge, Cedar Rapids, Iowa (two levels of roadway above a Cedar River dam)

 Multilevel streets in Chicago
 Colombus Drive
 Lake Shore Drive 
 Michigan Avenue
 Randolph Street
 Stetson Avenue
 Wacker Drive
 South Water Street
 Bi-level walkway bridge at Denver International Airport

See also 
 List of road-rail bridges

References 

Multi-level bridges